FFR may refer to:

Medicine
 Fellowship of the Faculty of Radiology of the Royal College of Surgeons in Ireland
 Fractional flow reserve, a technique used in coronary catheterization
 Frequency following response

Military
 Falster Foot Regiment, a Royal Danish Army infantry regiment
 Frontier Force Regiment, of the Pakistani Army
 Fitted For Radio,  British Army designators for vehicles equipped to carry radio equipment

Music 
 Fast Food Rockers, a British pop group
 Fit for Rivals, an American band
 For Future Reference, a 1981 album by the British synthpop band Dramatis
 Friendly Fire Recordings, an American record label

Sports 
 French Rugby Federation
 French Rugby League Federation
 Russian Fencing Federation
 FC Fazisi Racha, a Georgian association football club

Transportation
 Factory Five Racing, an American automobile kit company
 Franconian Forest Railway, in Bavaria, Germany
 Fischer Air, a defunct Czech airline

Other
 Federal funds rate, in the United States
 Filtering face respirator, a particulate-filtering respirator worn on the face, such an N95
 Firearm–related Fatality Rate, measure in the epidemiology of firearm–related fatalities
 Five Finger Rapids, Yukon River, Yukon, Canada
 Flathead Forest Reserve, Montana
 Franciscan Friars of the Renewal, a religious institute in the Latin Church of the Catholic Church
 French First Republic
 Frontline Freelance Register, association of freelance journalistswho work on military and humanitarian frontlines
 Final Form Ride Series, a toy line of Kamen Rider Decade action figures